Ulla Maaskola (born 5 April 1959) is a Finnish cross-country skier. She competed in the women's 10 kilometres at the 1980 Winter Olympics.

Cross-country skiing results

Olympic Games

World Cup

Season standings

References

External links
 

1959 births
Living people
People from Kouvola
Finnish female cross-country skiers
Olympic cross-country skiers of Finland
Cross-country skiers at the 1980 Winter Olympics
Sportspeople from Kymenlaakso